The William Lake (in French: Lac William) is a lake located in the municipality of Saint-Ferdinand, in L'Érable Regional County Municipality (MRC), in the administrative region of Centre-du-Québec, in Quebec, in Canada. It is crossed by the Bécancour River, which flows up to the South shore of St. Lawrence River.

Toponymy 
The lake had been named Saint-Ferdinand by the French Canadians established on the southwest shore of the lake around 1850, but the current name comes from the Scots, living in the north. This name commemorates William Pitt, a popular statesman of England.

Geography 

See also 
 Bécancour River

References

External links 
Association du lac William

Lakes of Centre-du-Québec
L'Érable Regional County Municipality